Jolarpettai Junction railway station  (station code: JTJ) is located in the Tirupattur district of Tamil Nadu, India. Jolarpettai Junction railway falls within Chennai Central- Bangalore City Line via  Bangarapet Junction, Krishnarajapuram and  Jolarpettai–Shoranur line leading to Kerala trunk via Salem Jn, Erode Jn, Coimbatore Jn, Palakkad Jn and hence connect Chennai to Mangalore through ShoranurJn, Kozhikode and Kannur. Chennai to Thiruvananthapuram through Thrissur, Ernakulam Jn and Kollam Jn  .

Lines
 Double electrified BG line Towards  (North)
 Double electrified BG line Towards  (West)
 Double electrified BG line Towards  (South)

Trains
Around 190 trains stop here and pass to Salem Junction, Bangalore City and Katpadi junction.

References

Railway stations in Vellore district
Chennai railway division
Railway junction stations in Tamil Nadu
Jolarpet